Concerto was a Canadian music television miniseries which aired on CBC Television in 1976.

Premise
Toronto Symphony Orchestra conductor Victor Feldbrill presented this classical music series featuring ensembles such as the Chamber Players of Toronto and violinist Jean Carignan.

Scheduling
This half-hour series of seven episodes was broadcast on selected Wednesdays at 9:30 p.m. (Eastern) from 18 February to 4 August 1976.

References

External links
 

CBC Television original programming
1976 Canadian television series debuts
1976 Canadian television series endings